Hell's Bells is a comedy play in three acts written by Barry Conners. It was first produced on the Broadway stage at the Wallack's Theatre opening January 26, 1925, and ran for 120 performances.
Produced by Herman Gantvoort and staged by John Hayden, the opening night cast included Humphrey Bogart starring as Jimmy Todhunter and Shirley Booth starring as Nan Winchester.

The setting is the Tanglewood Lodge, New Dauville, Connecticut.

Trivia
In one scene of the original production, Bogart appeared on stage carrying a racket and, as he glanced around at the other male performers, delivered the line, "Tennis anyone?" That was a result of the director devising a setup to move some actors off the stage for a scene focusing only on the two leading actresses.

External links
Hell's Bells at the IBDB
1925 plays
Broadway plays